The 1902 Princeton Tigers football team represented Princeton University in the 1902 college football season. The team finished with an 8–1 record under first-year head coach Garrett Cochran.  The Tigers won their first eight games, including seven shutouts, and outscored their opponents by a total of 164 to 17.  The team's only loss was in the last game of the season by a 12–5 score against Yale. Princeton guard John DeWitt, who later won the silver medal in the hammer throw at the 1904 Summer Olympics, was selected as a consensus first-team honoree on the 1902 College Football All-America Team.

Schedule

References

Princeton
Princeton Tigers football seasons
Princeton Tigers football